The Women's Issues Network of Belize is the only network of organizations in Belize whose focus is on the empowerment of women. The network currently has 11 member agencies countrywide.

As a network WIN's purpose is to provide leadership by empowering and strengthening its member agencies. It develops linkages among organizations that promotes the development of women, facilitates the sharing of knowledge, skills and resources, and advocates for improving the quality of life of women and their families in Belize.

Background
WIN-Belize was established in 1993 when several Belizean organizations came together as a steering committee with the goal of speaking with a common voice on women's issues, and improving the situation of women in Belize. Since that time, WIN-Belize has gone through several stages in its institutional life.  After working on some advocacy and information sharing activities in its early years, the initiative experienced some growing pains and institutional challenges that led to a re-organization in 1997, resulting in a revitalized steering committee and the opening of a small office with a part-time coordinator. By 1998 WIN-Belize became legally registered, with its stated purpose to be a membership network working towards women's equality and gender equity. Key WIN-Belize activities during this period were the follow-up on the minimum wage campaign and the “Women at Work” conference.

Between 2000 and 2004, comprehensive evaluations and planning processes took place within WIN-Belize. A strategic plan for 2002-2004 was developed in 2001 and in 2004 an external evaluation was conducted as a condition of the 2002-2004 HIVOS project. Members supported the planning efforts by collectively analyzing the national and gender context, identifying issues of concern and developing the actions needed to address the causes of the internal problems.  In particular, four focus group sessions with members were held between 2003 and 2004 to help identify issues for WIN-Belize's efforts. The sessions focused on four different subjects: violence, health, women in economy, and social and economic development. The Gender Budget Campaign was developed in 2006 as a follow-up to the women in the economy issue.  In 2004, WIN also became officially registered under the Non-Governmental Organizations Act of Belize.

The National Context in which WIN-Belize operates

Belize's population is between 260,000 and 270,000 people, with approximately half being women. More than thirty-three percent are estimated to live below the poverty line; more women than men fall in this category. The female-headed household is still a significant feature on the household organization landscape.

In March 2003, the fifth general elections were held since Belize's Independence in 1981; the ruling People's United Party Government was returned to power with a 22 to 7 majority. That majority now stands at 21 to 8 as a result of a by-election in one constituency in October 2003. Of these 29 parliamentarians, only 1 is a woman, a decrease from the previous administration which had 2 women. Women are the backbone of political parties in Belize, but they continue to be grossly under-represented at the highest levels of decision-making.

Despite gains made over the years as a result of efforts to reform the national health system, critical problems remain in the area of women's health and well-being. Problems related to reproductive and sexual health are the leading causes of morbidity and mortality among women of child-bearing age (15 – 44 years). Though teenage pregnancy has declined in recent years, it still remains high. In the words of Rodel Pererra, Executive Director of the Alliance Against Aids (AAA), "Belize is witnessing the feminization of the HIV virus as well as the disease. The male: female HIV ratio is approximately 1:1. There is urgent need to examine the causes of these developments."

In education, males and females have equal access to schools at the various levels and while there are no significant differences in terms of enrollment, there is a trend for higher male repetition and dropout rates at the secondary level. Slightly more women than men attend the University of Belize, but the female population is older than the male population, suggesting that women in the labor force are returning to school to improve their situation. Women are still predominate in pursuing traditional female-dominated courses of study.

Gender-based violence is still very much a part of everyday life for countless women in Belize. Between May and November 2003, staff of the Women's Dept tracked the issue of domestic violence in the local newspapers, and noted at least 10 women having been killed allegedly by boyfriends, partners or ex-partners. Many more are victims of beatings, maiming and other forms of abuse.

Unemployment rates for women are twice that of men and the female labor force, though more highly educated than the male labor force is paid less for work of comparative value.

The above picture is the backdrop against which the government of Belize developed a national gender policy in 2002. The policy resulted from the country's response to the 4th World Conference on Women in Beijing in 1995. Several years following the conference, the government of Belize, through the Women's Department, organized a series of nationwide consultations to provide feedback on the Beijing conference.  The Belizean populace was solicited for information on what they saw as the priority areas to be addressed in a national plan of action towards gender equality and equity. The areas identified were health, education, violence, economic empowerment, and power and decision-making. A national task force was established to develop the national plan of action. The policy, an initiative of the Women's Commission, sought to further legalize the plan.

WIN-Belize, and some of its member agencies, have played a significant role in these national processes. In the early 1990s the Belize Organization for Women and Development (BOWAND) advocated for and was successful in getting the first minimum wage established in Belize. However, despite BOWAND's success in getting the first official minimum wage for the country, the outcome was in actuality two minimum wages, one for agricultural, manual and unskilled laborers (BZ$2.25) and one for domestic workers and shop assistants (BZ$1.75). This latter group was predominantly women. Taken as an outright discrimination against women, in the late nineties WIN took up the challenge to get one minimum wage. This campaign succeeded in 2001 with the establishment of a national minimum wage.

Generally speaking, Belize can point to real progress in achieving de jure equality; however, the road to de facto equality is still long and winding. There is urgent need for a permanent mechanism outside of government, to systematically and objectively monitor Belize's performance in fulfilling its commitments to achieving women's emancipation, empowerment and gender equity, and to keep up the pressure to change the status quo. The opportunity exists for WIN-Belize to take up this role.

Priority Issues
WIN-Belize believes that the position of women in Belize is improving but there is still room for improvement, especially in the area of development planning where it is still centered on the reproductive roles and responsibilities of women. Even though women contribute to the well being of society, it is still a common practice for many planners to think of women's contribution as occurring only through the roles they perform in domestic settings.

The network focuses on addressing violence against women, sexual and reproductive health rights, HIV and sustainable economic livelihood.

Governance Structure and Staffing
WIN-Belize's current governance structure is described in its revised Articles of Association (2006) and its Policy and Operational Manual.   Although these articles of association state that it can accept individuals as members, to date the network does not have any as registered members.

The AGM elects a 5 to 9 member Board of Directors for a two-year term and a staggered membership process (as outlined in the articles of association) ensures continuity.  The executive positions on the board are elected from among the board members themselves and include a Chair, Vice Chair, Treasurer, Secretary and Assistant Secretary/Treasurer.   Sub-committees are allowed under the current structure. The Articles of Association clearly outline the powers and duties of the Board.

The Articles of Association also provide for a staffed secretariat to assist in the coordination and execution of WIN-Belize activities.   The secretariat is managed by an Executive Director who is supervised by the Board of Directors.   The Executive Director is responsible for the management of the day-to-day work of the secretariat which provides the logistical support to the members and the Board to execute WIN-Belize's activities.

Funding Situation
WIN-Belize's secretariat is presently funded by HIVOS as its core funding agency, UNFPA, Match International for Sexuality and Sexual Health – HIV/AIDS project. A small annual subvention is also received from the Government of Belize.

Challenges
In January, 2004, one of WIN-Belize's Institutional Funders conducted an Institutional Strengthening Assessment of the Network. The assessment found that WIN-Belize was highly capable of administration and financial management and reporting, and that its staff was highly motivated, but that it lacked strategic direction in achieving gender equity and equality in Belize.  In this context, two major issues were flagged for discussion and decision-making:

 Should WIN-Belize become a gender issues network which focuses on programs for men and women?  Or should the Network continue to focus on women's rights, incorporating a gender perspective?
 Should WIN-Belize continue to be “a service-oriented network” or a “network of service-oriented organizations”?

The need to clarify these two issues prompted the Network to urgently engage in a new Strategic Planning process so that collective and participatory dialogue among member agencies could inform the decision-making process.

In February 2008, the organization completed an independent evaluation (B.Barraza/D.Vernon Evaluation Report) of its institution, functions and programmes as part of a request from one of its donors, HIVOS, to assess its success in managing a joint project with two (2) other WIN-Belize members.  That evaluation, coupled with an earlier assessment completed in 2004 (D.Haylock/P.Welch Evaluation Report), resulting in findings that remain relevant, had highlighted several key areas with a view to enhancing its strategic direction for the future that required consideration by the organization's board and member agencies. The network had engaged a consultant to develop the framework for its 2005 to 2009 Strategic Plan; however, a majority of the network members conceded that they did not feel fully engaged in the process of its development and as a result they were not applying the plan's recommendations.   Consequently, in November 2008, WIN-Belize commissioned a consultant to undertake its next strategic plan.

Members

The members of WIN-Belize provide service in the areas of health, education, human rights, gender issues, labour issues, environmental issues, economic empowerment and youth empowerment.

 Alliance Against AIDS
 Belize Family Life Association
 Belize Audubon Society
 Belize Enterprise for Sustainable Technology
 Cotton Tree Women's Group
 Fajina Chairladies
 Haven House
 LEAP Women's Group
 Plenty Belize
 Progressive Organization for Women in Action
 Sazani
 United Belize Advocacy Movement (UNIBAM)
 Young Women's Christian Association
 Youth Enhancement Services

References

External links
 Winbelize.org
 WIN Belize Strategic Plan 2009‐2011
 Health Care in Belize
 What Can I Do?
 Women’s Issues Network of Belize Press Releases
 Funding for Women's Issues, September 2010
 Weaving Through History of the Women's Movement
 WIN-Belize Calls for Stiffer Penalties
 WIN-Belize Breaks Down the Budget
 WIN-BELIZE SPEAKS OUT AGAINST VIOLENCE
 WIN-Belize holds open day
 HIVOS & WIN-Belize
 Belize’s Oral Statement presented to CEDAW, July 2007
 Women's Issues Network of Belize Shadow Report presented to CEDAW, May 2007
 Belize's Report, Gender from a Belizean perspective commissioned by the Win-Belize, April 2004
 Belize Audubon Society

Non-profit organisations based in Belize
Women's organizations based in Belize